Demetrio Madrid López (born 1 August 1936) is a Spanish politician and member of the Spanish Socialist Workers' Party (PSOE) who served as President of the Junta of Castile and León from May 1983 to November 1986.

References

1936 births
People from the Province of Zamora
Presidents of the Junta of Castile and León
Spanish Socialist Workers' Party politicians
Living people
Members of the 1st Cortes of Castile and León
Members of the 2nd Cortes of Castile and León
Members of the 3rd Cortes of Castile and León